Harrow on the Hill is a locality and historic village in the borough of Harrow in Greater London, England. The name refers to Harrow Hill, and is located some half a mile south of the modern town of Harrow. The village dates back to early medieval times, built around the 11th-century St Mary's Church, and is the location of Harrow, St Dominic's and John Lyon schools.

Etymology
Etymology before 1398 derives from Harrow, & The Saxon Chronicles/The Peterborough Chronicle, which first recorded Harrow Hill in 767 as Gumeninga Hergae. 
A suggested meaning is "heathen temple" of a tribe called the 'Gumeningas', sons of Gumen.
One of the earliest recorded uses of the name is found in 1398 as Harrowe atte Hille. The hill has historically been used as a place of pagan worship. It is alternatively explained to mean the church upon the hill.

History

Harrow on the Hill formed an ancient parish and later civil parish in the Gore hundred of Middlesex. There were significant boundary changes in 1894, when the bulk of the parish was removed to create the parishes of Harrow Weald, Wealdstone and Wembley. By this time, the hamlet of Greenhill to the north had developed into what would become the modern town of Harrow.

It formed the Harrow on the Hill Urban District of Middlesex from 1894 and was abolished by a County Review Order in 1934, with the bulk of the area forming part of a new civil parish and urban district of Harrow. In 1954, the urban district was incorporated as the Municipal Borough of Harrow and in 1965 it was transferred to Greater London to form the London Borough of Harrow.

King Charles I
On 27 April 1646, King Charles I, when fleeing Oxford on his way to Southwell, where he was due to surrender to the Scottish Army, stopped at Harrow on the Hill near St Mary's Church, so that he could take a final glimpse at London and also to water his horses. A plaque on Grove Hill near Harrow School marks the spot, and also says that the spring below has ever since been called King Charles' Well.

Photo record
The Hills & Saunders photography company had a studio on Harrow on the Hill in the 1860s photographing the schools, families and local area. The archive of c. 80,000 glass plates still exists and much of it is online at the Harrow Photos website.

Demography
The population of the Harrow on the Hill ward of the London Borough of Harrow was 9,578 in 1991 and 10,632 in 2001. There were 4,539 households in the district in 2001. The ward's boundaries encompass the majority of the hill and also Roxeth, Sudbury Hill and parts of West Harrow.

The 2011 census showed ethnically Whites were largest at 47.3% (34.4% British, 9.6% "Other White" excluding Irish), 35.4% were Asian (19.1% Indian, 11.6% "Other Asian"). The most spoken foreign languages were Gujarati followed by Tamil. The Asian community in Harrow is among the most affluent in the UK. Of the over 4,500 households, the amount of whole house/bungalow and of flat/maisonette accommodations are about evenly split; 57.6% of property tenures are owned, 28.8% are privately rented, and 13.8% are socially rented. A relatively large share of residents, 28.4%, have a professional occupation. The unemployment rate for working people was 4.1%. The median age was 33.5 years.

Gallery

Religion

Harrow on the Hill is also an ecclesiastical parish with St. Mary's, Harrow on the Hill at the apex. It was consecrated by St Anselm in 1094. There is also a Roman Catholic parish church at the foot of the hill, Our Lady and St Thomas of Canterbury, Harrow, dedicated to Our Lady and St Thomas of Canterbury.

Churchfields, Harrow on the Hill, centre of the Harrow Pentagram:  Hergae Mound Oak trees leading from the Yew tree grove in Churchfields to the (Leyline-linked) Yew tree grove in St Mary's Church. Hergae Mound is also a direct flight line for pipistrelle bats and barn owls - very active at dusk. The Harrow Pentagram: Centre is St. Mary's at Harrow-on-the-hill. The five points around it are: Belmont Hill Stanmore, Horsenden Hill Greenford, Barn Hill Wembley, Dabbs Hill, St. John's Pinner.  Harrow on the Hill's original name 'Gumeninga hergae' suggests that the pagan practises may have still been taking place on the hill – despite increasing conversion to Christianity at the time.

The area has four Catholic schools and three Church of England schools.

Transport

Harrow-on-the-Hill station, although named after the settlement, is located some distance to the north of the hill. The London Underground service at Harrow-on-the-Hill is on the Metropolitan line, and the station is also served by the Chiltern Railways London to Aylesbury Line. These services run in to central London, and out west/north west to the outer reaches of London and beyond.

About equidistant to Harrow-on-the-Hill station from the top of the hill, is South Harrow on the Piccadilly line. The 258 and H17 London bus routes run over Harrow on the Hill itself.

Street accident fatality
A roadside plaque unveiled on 25 February 1969 states that the first recorded motor accident in Great Britain to have involved the death of the car driver took place at Harrow on the Hill on a road called Grove Hill seventy years earlier, on 25 February 1899. The plaque makes no mention of the name of the dead motorist, but it does name the civic dignitary who unveiled it: his name is given as Alderman Charles Stenhouse, who was Mayor of Harrow at the time.

The driver involved in the crash was 31-year-old engineer Edwin Sewell, driving a 6HP Daimler. A rear wheel collapsed after breaking its rim and the car hit a sturdy brick wall. Sewell was killed immediately when he and his passenger, a Major Richer, were thrown from the vehicle. Richer died three days later in hospital.

Early railway accident fatality
In the graveyard of St Mary's church is a gravestone recording the death of Thomas Port in the railway accident on 7 August 1838.

Geography

References

External links 
 

 
Districts of the London Borough of Harrow
Areas of London
Anglo-Saxon paganism
Places formerly in Middlesex